BC Samara is a Russian professional basketball team that is based in Samara, Russia.

History

BC Samara (1976–2002) 
Club was founded in Tolyatti as BC Azot. Club was a silver medalist of the Russian Super League 1 in 1992, and a 3-time bronze medalist, in the years 1993, 1997, and 1998.

CSK VVS (1992–2002) 
Another club from Samara was formally patronized by the Russian Air Force (VVS). After the collapse of Soviet Union, the most of the staff of basketball club SKA Alma-Ata and basketball players along with coach moved to Samara and new club "CSK VVS" was founded. The club was registered in the first edition of Russian basketball league.

In 1997, after bankruptcy, club was moved to Tula, Russia and founded as Arsenal Tula.

CSK VVS - Samara (2002–2010) 
In 2002, CSK VVS was refounded and merged with BC Samara, to form a new club called "CSK VVS - Samara". In the 2006–07 season, this club won the championship of the European-wide 4th tier-level league, the FIBA EuroCup. 

However, CSK VVS- Samara went bankrupt in 2009 and team could not participate in the 2009–10 Russian Super League 1 season. Thus, it was replaced in the league by Krasnye Krylya Samara.

BC Samara (2012–present) 
In 2012, CSK VVS - Samara was refounded as "Samara SGEU" and in 2014 club got back its old name "Samara". In 2015, Krasnye Krylya Samara merged with BC Samara. BC Samara won Russian Super League 1 twice in season 2018-19 and 2020-21.

In 2022 BC Samara joined VTB United League.

Honours
FIBA EuroCup Challenge
Champions (1): 2006–07

Russian Basketball Super League
Champions (2): 2018–19, 2020-21

Russian Cup
Champions (2): 2019–20, 2021-22

Arena
The club plays its home games at the 1,500 seat MTL Arena in Samara

Logos

Players

Current roster

Notable players

 Sergei Chikalkin (1996–98, 2008–10)
 Milan Preković (2001–02)
 Aleksandar Čubrilo (2001–02)
 Joe Wylie (2001–02)
 Giorgi Tsintsadze (2004–05)
 James Wade (2004)
 Omar Cook (2006–07)
 Kelvin Gibbs (2006–07)
 Georgios Diamantopoulos (2006–07)
 Nikita Shabalkin (2006–07)
 Sam Clancy, Jr. (2008–09)
 Andrew Sullivan (2008–09)
 Ikechukwu Nwamu (2021)
 Malcolm Thomas (2022–present)

Head coaches
 Sergei Bazarevich (2005–06, 2022–present)
 Valeri Tikhonenko (2005–09)

References

External links

Official Website 
Eurobasket.com Team Info

Basketball teams in Russia
Sport in Samara, Russia
Basketball teams in the Soviet Union